Vivekananda Global University  is a private university located in Jaipur, Rajasthan in India. It was established under the Act No.11/2012 of the Government of Rajasthan and is sponsored by Bagaria Education Trust, Jaipur.

VGU is recognized by All India Council for Technical Education, Bar Council of India, Association of Indian Universities, University Grants Commission (UGC) New Delhi, Council of Architecture, Ministry of Skill Development and Entrepreneurship, Ministry of Rural Development and Pharmacy Council of India.

History
The university was founded by the Bagaria Education Trust, which established the Swami Keshvanand Institute of Technology (SKIT) Management & Gramothan, Jaipur; Gramotthan Vidyapeeth, Nagaur; Swami Keshvanand Institute of Pharmacy(SKIP), Bikaner; Swami Keshvanand Institute of Pharmacy(SKIP), Jaipur; Vivekananda Institute of Technology, Jaipur; Vivek Techno School in Jaipur, Nagaur & Bikaner; and Marudhar Engineering College, Bikaner. 

Collaborations At Vivekananda Global University, Jaipur

Edinburgh Napier University 
Swansea University
University of Wolverhampton
Tennessee State University
Leland Stanford Junior University

Academic programs
The University offers Bachelors, Masters, Engineering Diploma programs, and Doctoral degrees. The Engineering and Diploma programs are offered under the Faculty of Engineering & Technology.

B.Tech. Programs
B.Tech programs are offered in the following disciplines:
Civil Engineering
Computer Science
Electrical Engineering
Electronics & Communication Engineering
Mechanical Engineering

The engineering programs have three below options which can be chosen by the students:
Dual degree/ Twinning Program with either Edinburgh Napier University or Swansea University through which student can complete seven semesters of the course in the university campus and can move to any of those two universities for the last semester of the course.
Integrated B.Tech +M.Tech.
Industrial Internship - The students are allowed to do a full-time six-month internship during the last semester of the course.

Other UG programs. 

B.Sc.(Physics, Chemistry, Maths, Information Technology, Botany , Zoology)
B.Sc. (Hons.) in (Physics, Maths, Chemistry, Botany)
B.Sc.(H) in Agriculture, Agro Business management
B.Arch
B.Des- Fashion Design, Interior Design, Lifestyle Design, Visual Communication
BBA- BBA, BBA+LLB
B.Com
BCA
B.A.- BA, BA+LLB
B.Sc. Optometry

M.Tech Courses 
M.Tech programs are offered in the following disciplines:

Civil Engineering
Computer Science Engineering

M.Sc. programs 

Physics 
Mathematics
Chemistry
Botany 
Zoology
Agronomy

MBA

HR
Marketing
Finance
ABM
International Accounting
Entrepreneurship

Research programs

Vivekananda Global University, Jaipur offers Ph.D. programs in following streams.

Sciences (Physics, Chemistry,Mathematics)

Engineering

Diploma Programs

Diploma programs are offered in the following disciplines:

Civil Engineering
Computer Science
Electrical Engineering
Mechanical Engineering
Pharmacy
Humanities 
Management

Constituent colleges
 Marudhar Engineering College, Bikaner
 Vivekananda Institute of Technology Jaipur
 Swami Keshvanand Institute of Technology 
 Vivekananda Institute of Technology(East) Jaipur
 Vivek Techno School

Global centre for entrepreneurship and commerce [GCEC].

See also
List of institutions of higher education in Rajasthan

References

External links

Private universities in India
Engineering colleges in Jaipur
Universities and colleges in Jaipur
Universities in Rajasthan
Educational institutions established in 2012
2012 establishments in Rajasthan